Ludovic Covaci-Borbely (born 20 February 1939) is a Romanian rower. He competed in the men's coxless four event at the 1964 Summer Olympics.

References

1939 births
Living people
Romanian male rowers
Olympic rowers of Romania
Rowers at the 1964 Summer Olympics
Sportspeople from Timișoara